David Boon is a former international cricketer who represented Australia between 1984 and 1996.  A right-handed batsman who primarily played as an opener, Boon took part in 107 Test matches and 181 One Day Internationals (ODIs) for his country and scored centuries (100 or more runs in a single innings) on twenty-one and five occasions respectively.

Boon made his Test and ODI debuts against the West Indies in 1984. He made his first Test century in December 1985, when he scored 123 against India at the Adelaide Oval. He achieved his highest Test score in 1989, when he made 200—his solitary double-century—against New Zealand at the WACA Ground, Perth. Boon scored three centuries in three consecutive Tests, against India during the 1991–92 home series; he achieved the feat once more in the 1993 Ashes series. His accomplishments with the bat during the 1993 English cricket season led to Wisden naming him as one of their Cricketers of the Year in 1994 and describing him as "the most assured batsman in the Australian team". , Boon is ninth (with Neil Harvey) in the list of leading Test century-makers for Australia. He scored centuries against six different opponents, including six outside Australia. He was most successful against England, scoring seven Test centuries; six of his Test centuries came against India.

Boon's first ODI century came against India at the Sawai Mansingh Stadium, Jaipur in September 1986. His highest score in ODI cricket was against Sri Lanka during the 1987–88 World Series Cup when he scored 122 at the Adelaide Oval. He was most successful against India, accumulating two ODI centuries. , he holds fourteenth position with Damien Martyn in the list of ODI century-makers for Australia.

Key

Test cricket centuries

One Day International centuries

References

External links

Boon,centuries
Boon, David